Heritage Community Christian School is an independent Christian school serving Brockville and Leeds and Grenville. The school teaches children in JK through grade 8 through a Christian worldview.  The school has approximately 100 students.

Extracurricular activities
The school has a music program, including choir and music theory.

The school is also involved in other programs including: robotics competition, service projects, historical fair, and track and field.

Location
The school is located about a 20 minute drive from downtown Brockville, Ontario in a small settlement named New Dublin, Ontario. The school is near the geographic middle of Leeds and Grenville.

Associations
HCCS is a member of Edvance Christian School Association.

References

External links
Heritage Community Christian School (official site)

Christian schools in Canada
Private schools in Ontario